Denise Kielholtz (born 30 March 1989) is a Dutch female Muay Thai kickboxer and mixed martial artist, based in Amsterdam, Netherlands. She has competed professionally since 2004 and is the current Bellator Kickboxing Women's Flyweight Champion. As of February 7, 2023, she is #9 in the Bellator Women's pound-for-pound Rankings and #5 in the Bellator Women's Flyweight Rankings.

Mixed martial arts career

Kielholtz made her professional MMA debut at Torarica Summer Fights 1 in October, 2015. She lost the fight via submission.

Bellator MMA

Kielholtz signed with Bellator in 2016, appearing in the promotion's inaugural kickboxing card, Bellator Kickboxing 1 in Torino, Italy on April 16, 2016. She would go 4–1 in kickboxing for the promotion, winning the Flyweight Championship along the way.

Kielholtz then made her Bellator MMA debut at Bellator 188 against Jessica Middleton. She won the fight via submission.

Kielholtz was expected to face Lena Ovchynnikova in the co-main event of Bellator 196 in Budapest, Hungary on April 6, 2018. However, Ovchynnikova pulled out of the fight and was replaced by Petra Částková. Kielholtz won the fight by unanimous decision.

Kielholtz faced Veta Arteaga on September 21, 2018 at Bellator 205. She lost the fight via a submission.

Kielholtz faced Bryony Tyrell at Bellator 223 on June 22, 2019. She won the fight via TKO in the third round.

Kielholtz faced Sabriye Şengül at Bellator London 2 on November 23, 2019. She won the fight via an Americana submission in the first round.

Kielholtz faced Kristina Williams at Bellator 239 on February 21, 2020. She won the fight via a rear-naked choke submission in the first round.

Kielholtz faced former Bellator Women's Flyweight title challenger Kate Jackson at Bellator 247 on October 1, 2020. She won the bout via knockout just 43 seconds into the first round. Subsequently, she signed a new contract with the Bellator MMA.

Kielholtz fought for the Bellator Women's Flyweight World Championship against champion Juliana Velasquez on July 16, 2021 at Bellator 262. She lost the bout in a razor thin split decision.

Kielholtz faced Kana Watanabe on May 13, 2022 at Bellator 281. She lost the fight via a triangle choke submission in the second round.

Kielholtz faced Ilara Joanne on December 9, 2022, at Bellator 289. She lost the fight via split decision.

Personal life
Kielholtz is married to kickboxer Hesdy Gerges.

Championships and awards

Kickboxing
 Bellator Kickboxing
 Bellator Kickboxing Women's Flyweight Championship (One time, current)
 Enfusion
2014 Enfusion Live Champion 57 kg (1 Title Def.)
2012 Enfusion -60 kg (Winner)
 World Muay Thai Association
2013 WMTA Super Bantamweight World Champion
 World Full Contact Association
2013 WFCA European Champion, -57 kg
 Slamm
2011 Slamm Women's Championship -60 kg

Judo
2008 Dutch Team Championships 
2006 Dutch Open Espoir U20 Tournament 
2005 Scottish Open U20 Championships Edinburgh 
2005 Scottish Open Championships Edinburgh 
2005 Dutch Championships U17 
2004 Dutch Open Espoir U17 Tournament 
2003 Dutch Championships U15 Nieuwegein 
2002 Dutch Championships U15 Nieuwegein

Boxing
2012 Amateur Arabic Featherweight World Champion 55 kg (Defeated Lorena Klijn) -56 kg

Mixed martial arts record

|-
|Loss
|align=center|6–5
|Ilara Joanne
|Decision (split)
|Bellator 289
|
|align=center|3
|align=center|5:00
|Uncasville, Connecticut, United States
|
|-
|Loss
|align=center|6–4
|Kana Watanabe
|Submission (triangle choke)
|Bellator 281 
|
|align=center|2
|align=center|3:03
|London, England
|
|-
|Loss
|align=center|6–3
|Juliana Velasquez
|Decision (split)
|Bellator 262
|
|align=center|5
|align=center|5:00
|Uncasville, Connecticut, United States
|
|-
|Win
|align=center|6–2
|Kate Jackson
|KO (punches)
|Bellator 247
|
|align=center|1
|align=center|0:43
|Milan, Italy 
|
|-
|Win
|align=center|5–2
|Kristina Williams
|Submission (rear-naked choke)
|Bellator 239
|
|align=center|1
|align=center|2:15
|Thackerville, Oklahoma, United States
|
|-
|Win
|align=center|4–2
|Sabriye Şengül
|Submission (americana)
|Bellator London 2
|
|align=center|1
|align=center|0:32
|London, England
|
|-
|Win
|align=center|3–2
|Bryony Tyrell
|TKO (punches)
|Bellator 223
|
|align=center|3
|align=center|2:48
|London, England
|
|-
|Loss
|align=center|2–2
|Veta Arteaga
|Submission (guillotine choke)
|Bellator 205
|
|align=center|2
|align=center|4:24
|Boise, Idaho, United States
|
|-
|Win
|align=center|2–1
|Petra Částková
|Decision (unanimous)
|Bellator 196
|
|align=center|3
|align=center|5:00
|Budapest, Hungary
|
|-
| Win
| align=center| 1–1
| Jessica Middleton
| Submission (scarfhold armbar)
| Bellator 188
| 
| align=center| 1
| align=center| 1:16
| Tel Aviv, Israel
| 
|-
|Loss
|style="text-align:center;"|0–1
|Juliete de Souza Silva
|Submission (armbar)
|Torarica Summer Fights 1
|
|style="text-align:center;"|1
|style="text-align:center;"|N/A
|Paramaribo, Suriname 
|   
|-

Kickboxing record

|-  style="background:#cfc;"
| 2022-10-29 || Win ||align=left| Laura Pileri || HIT IT  || Rotterdam, Netherlands ||  Decision (unanimous) || 3 || 3:00 || 19–2
|-
|-  style="background:#cfc;"
| 2017-04-08 || Win ||align=left| Martine Michieletto || Bellator Kickboxing 5 || Torino, Italy || Decision (unanimous) || 5 || 3:00 || 18–2
|-
! style=background:white colspan=9 |
|-  style="background:#cfc;"
| 2016-12-10 || Win ||align=left| Gloria Peritore || Bellator Kickboxing 4|| Florence, Italy || Decision (split)  || 5 || 3:00 || 17–2
|-
! style=background:white colspan=9 |
|-  style="background:#cfc;"
| 2016-09-17 || Win ||align=left| Renata Lantos || Bellator Kickboxing 3 || Budapest, Hungary || Decision (unanimous) || 3 || 3:00 || 16–2
|-  style="background:#fbb;"
| 2016-06-24 || Loss ||align=left| Gloria Peritore || Bellator Kickboxing 2 || St. Louis, Missouri, United States || Decision (split) || 3 || 3:00 || 15–2
|-  style="background:#cfc;"
| 2016-04-16 || Win ||align=left| Veronica Vernocchi || Bellator Kickboxing 1 || Torino, Italy || Decision (split) || 3 || 3:00 || 15–1
|-  style="background:#cfc;"
| 2014-11-23 || Win ||align=left| Tiffany van Soest  || Enfusion Live 22 || Groningen, Netherlands || Decision (unanimous) || 5 || 3:00 || 14–1
|-
! style=background:white colspan=9 |
|-  style="background:#cfc;"
| 2014-04-26 || Win ||align=left| Lucia Krajčovič || Enfusion Live 17 || Žilina, Slovakia || Decision (Unanimous) || 3 || 3:00 || 13–1
|-  style="background:#cfc;"
| 2014-04-26 || Win ||align=left| Ilona Wijmans || Enfusion Live 12 || Alkmaar, Netherlands || Decision (Overturned) || 5 ||3:00 || 12–1
|-
! style=background:white colspan=9 |
|-  style="background:#cfc;"
| 2013-09-17 || Win||align=left| Vicky Church || Enfusion 4: Search for the SuperPro, Finals || Koh Samui, Thailand || Decision (Unanimous) || 3 || 3:00 || 11–1
|-
! style=background:white colspan=9 |
|-  style="background:#cfc;"
| 2013-09-17 || Win||align=left| Manal Salman || Enfusion 4: Search for the SuperPro, Semi Finals || Koh Samui, Thailand || Decision (Unanimous) || 3 || 3:00 || 10–1
|-  style="background:#cfc;"
| 2013-06-29 || Win ||align=left| Christi Brereton || Enfusion Live 6 || London, England || Decision (Unanimous) || 3 ||3:00 || 9–1
|-  style="background:#cfc;"
| 2013-04-13 || Win ||align=left| Alena Hola ||  || Noordwijkerhout, Netherlands || Decision ||  ||  || 8–1  
|-
! style=background:white colspan=9 | 
|-  style="background:#cfc;"
| 2013-02-18 || Win ||align=left| Christina Morales ||  || The Hague, Netherlands || Decision ||  5 || 2:00 || 7–1
|-
! style=background:white colspan=9 | 
|-  style="background:#cfc;"
| 2012-12-02 || Win ||align=left| Lucy Payne || Enfusion 3: Trial of the Gladiators, Final || Ljubljana, Slovenia || Decision || 3 || 3:00 || 6–1
|-
! style=background:white colspan=9 |
|-  style="background:#cfc;"
| 2012-12-02 || Win ||align=left| Lindsay Scheer || Enfusion 3: Trial of the Gladiators, Semi Finals || Ljubljana, Slovenia || Decision || 3 || 3:00 || 5–1
|-  style="background:#cfc;"
| 2012-05-27 || Win ||align=left| Kateřina Svobodová || Slamm 7: Holland vs Thailand ||  || Decision || 3 || 3:00 || 4–1
|-  style="background:#cfc;"
| 2011-12-28 || Win ||align=left|  || Slamm!! Soema Na Basi II || Paramaribo, Suriname || Decision (unanimous) ||  || 3:00 || 3–1
|-
! style=background:white colspan=9 |
|-  style="background:#cfc;"
| 2011-04-10 || Win ||align=left| Sindy Huyer || Almere's Finest || Almere, Netherlands || Decision || 3 || 3:00 || 2–1
|-  style="background:#cfc;"
| 2010-08-29 || Win ||align=left| Lindsay Scheer || Slamm Fighting with the Stars - B- Class || Suriname || Decision || 3 || 3:00 || 1–1
|-  style="background:#fbb;"
| 2009-11-29 || Loss ||align=left| Lindsay Scheer || Slamm Holland vs. Thailand ||  || Decision || 3 || 3:00 || 0–1
|-
| colspan=9 | Legend:

References

External links
 
 

1989 births
Living people
Dutch female kickboxers
Sportspeople from Amsterdam
Dutch female mixed martial artists
Dutch Muay Thai practitioners
Featherweight mixed martial artists
Mixed martial artists utilizing Muay Thai
Mixed martial artists utilizing boxing
Mixed martial artists utilizing kickboxing
Mixed martial artists utilizing judo
Female Muay Thai practitioners
Flyweight kickboxers
Dutch female judoka
Dutch women boxers
Bellator female fighters
21st-century Dutch women